Russell John Morrison (died 4 June 2013 in Adelaide) was a Paralympic swimmer from Australia. He was a classified "5" competitor at the 1972 Heidelberg Paralympics representing Australia in backstroke, freestyle and medley events. He won two bronze medals in the 100 m freestyle and 3 x 50 m medley.

At the 1974 Commonwealth Paraplegic Games in Dunedin, New Zealand he won four gold medals in swimming: Men's 50m Freestyle Front Class 4 (Commonwealth record time), Men's 50m Freestyle Back Class 4 (Commonwealth record time), Men's 3 x 50m Individual Medley Class 4 and Men's 3 x 50m Medley Relay.

References

Male Paralympic swimmers of Australia
Swimmers at the 1972 Summer Paralympics
Paralympic bronze medalists for Australia
2013 deaths
Medalists at the 1972 Summer Paralympics
Paralympic medalists in swimming
Australian male freestyle swimmers
Australian male backstroke swimmers
Australian male medley swimmers
20th-century Australian people